The 1935–36 Idaho Vandals men's basketball team represented the University of Idaho during the 1935–36 NCAA college basketball season. Members of the Pacific Coast Conference, the Vandals were led by ninth-year head coach  and played their home games on campus at Memorial Gymnasium in Moscow, Idaho.

After the season in June, alumnus Fox resigned to enter private business.

References

External links
Sports Reference – Idaho Vandals: 1935–36 basketball season
Gem of the Mountains: 1936 University of Idaho yearbook – 1935–36 basketball season
Idaho Argonaut – student newspaper – 1936 editions

Idaho Vandals men's basketball seasons
Idaho
Idaho
Idaho